Andreas Eder (born 20 March 1996) is a German professional ice hockey player for EHC Red Bull München in the Deutsche Eishockey Liga (DEL) and the German national team.

He represented Germany at the 2021 IIHF World Championship.

References

External links

1996 births
Living people
EC Bad Tölz players
EHC München players
Expatriate ice hockey players in Austria
Expatriate ice hockey players in Canada
German expatriate ice hockey people
German expatriate sportspeople in Austria
German expatriate sportspeople in Canada
German ice hockey centres
German ice hockey right wingers
Nürnberg Ice Tigers players
SC Riessersee players
Straubing Tigers players
Vancouver Giants players
People from Miesbach (district)
Sportspeople from Upper Bavaria